This article lists players of the Brisbane Broncos club that have made representative appearances in State of Origin, international teams or other significant non-club teams.

State of Origin

Queensland Maroons
These are people who played for the Queensland State of Origin Team while playing for the Broncos.

New South Wales Blues
These are people who played for the New South Wales Rugby League team while playing for the Broncos.

City Origin
These are people who played for City Origin while playing for the Broncos. The City Origin team is a team formed of NSW players to play against Country Origin, as a selection trial for the NSW Blues.

International

Australia
These are people who played for the Australian International Team while playing for the Broncos.

 *Withdrew due to injury
 **Withdrew

New Zealand
These are people who played for the New Zealand International Team while playing for the Broncos.

Japan

Cook Islands

Samoa

Scotland

Tonga

Fiji

England

Ireland

Representative Captains

Test Captains
 Wally Lewis (1984–89)
 Allan Langer (1998)
 Gorden Tallis (2002–03)
 Darren Lockyer (2003–2010)

World Cup Captains
 Wally Lewis (1988 - 89) for Australia
 Gorden Tallis (2000) for Australia
 Lote Tuquiri (2000) for Fiji
 Darren Lockyer (2008) for Australia
 Adam Blair (2017) for New Zealand
 David Mead (2017) for Papua New Guinea

All Stars Game

Indigenous All Stars

NRL All Stars

See also

References

Brisbane sport-related lists
National Rugby League lists